San Htwe is a Burmese politician who currently serves as deputy speaker of Ayeyarwady Region Hluttaw and Ayeyarwaddy Region MP for  Danubyu Township  No2.

Early life and education
San Htwe was born  1957 in Danubyu, Myanmar. His previous job is lawyer. He had served as the Chairman of NLD Danubyu Township.

Political career
He is a member of the National League for Democracy. In the 2015 Myanmar general election, he was elected as an Ayeyarwady Region Hluttaw MP, winning a majority of 62% votes and elected representative from Danubyu Township No.2 parliamentary constituency.
He also served as secretary of the Legislative Committee and a member of the Public Complaints Committee.

References

National League for Democracy politicians
1957 births
Living people
People from Ayeyarwady Region